Harry Gorsuch is a stage and film actor who appeared in films from the late 1970s through to the mid-1980s.

Film
Two films that he appeared in he played policemen. One was as Sgt. Murphy in Stingray with Christopher Mitchum  and the other was as Capt. Hearn in the Peter Maris directed Delirium that starred Turk Cekovsky and Barron Winchester. Other films he appeared in were A Pleasure Doing Business that starred Conrad Bain  and as Harry in On the Right Track with Norman Fell and Gary Coleman in 1981.

Stage
Among his stage work, along with Jonnie King he appeared as Stosh in a 1967 stage production of Stalag 13.

Roles

Film
 Stingray ... 1978, Sgt. Murphy 
 A Pleasure Doing Business ... 1979, Mailman 
 Delirium
 On the Right Track ... 1981, Harry

Television
 Life on the Mississippi ... 1980, Harry 
 Jake and Mike... 1986, Manny Pinero

References

External links

Possibly living people
20th-century American male actors
Year of birth missing
Place of birth missing (living people)
American male stage actors
American male film actors
American male television actors